Lyamtsa is a rural locality (a village) in Pokrovskoye Rural Settlement of Onezhsky District, Arkhangelsk Oblast, Russia. The population was 115 as of 2010. There are 5 streets.

Geography 
Lyamtsa is located 129 km northwest of Onega (the district's administrative centre) by road. Purnema is the nearest rural locality.

References 

Rural localities in Onezhsky District
Onezhsky Uyezd